Quasilinear may refer to:

 Quasilinear function, a function that is both quasiconvex and quasiconcave
 Quasilinear utility, an economic utility function linear in one argument
 In complexity theory and mathematics, O(n log n) or sometimes O(n (log n)k)
 Quasilinear equation, a type of differential equation  where the coefficient(s) of the highest order derivative(s) of the unknown function do not depend on highest order derivative(s)